Alois Joseph Dessauer (born Aron Baruch Dessauer; February 21, 1763, Gochsheim - April 11, 1850, Aschaffenburg) was a famous German court banker (Court Jew).

He was the son of Baruch Dessauer. He married Anna Elisabeth David, with whom he had 4 children: Joseph Dessauer (1793–1853), Georg Dessauer (1795–1870), Karl Friedrich Dessauer (1799–1845) and Franz Johann Dessauer (1805–1872).

References
 Albert Haemmerle: Stammtafel der Familie Dessauer aus Aschaffenburg. A. Haemmerle, München, 1962

1763 births
1850 deaths
Court Jews
German bankers
18th-century German Jews
18th-century German businesspeople
19th-century German businesspeople
People from Schweinfurt (district)